Princess Khamwaen or Concubine Waen was a daughter of King Bunsan of Vientiane and a concubine (Chao Chom) to King Rama I of Bangkok. She was known for her prominent role in the Siamese court as a favorite companion of the monarch.

Biography

Princess Khamwaen was a daughter of King Bunsan of Vientiane and his wife the Princess of Nong Bualumphu. In 1779, King Taksin of Thonburi sent his general Somdet Chao Phraya Maha Kasatseuk to conquer the Vientiane kingdom. The city did fell and King Bunsan fled into the jungles. Princess Khamwaen was then captured and deported to Thonburi with her whole family including her brothers Prince Nanthasan, Prince Inthavong, and Prince Anouvong. Before reaching Thonburi, Princess Khamwaen became the general’s consort. 

On the occasion that the Somdet Chao Phraya ordered the total destruction of Nong Bualumphu, Princess Khamwaen pledged to her husband to change his mind. She was then revered by the inhabitants of Nong Bualamphu as Thau Khieu Khom. 

At Thonburi, Princess Khamwaen became Maha Kasatseuk’s favorite concubine and the target of Lady Nak’s anger – the general’s principal wife. On an occasion, Lady Nak hit Khamwaen with a wood stick. Hurt, Khamwaen went to the general for help. This led to the alienation between the Somdet Chao Phraya and his wife. 

The Somdet Chao Phraya crowned himself king in 1782 as Rama I and founded Bangkok. Princess Khamwaen became Chao Chom Waen. Chao Chom Waen became effectively the first Palace Matron of the Ratanakosin period, overseeing the court ladies and royal children. She was known for her strictness in governing the royal princes and princesses that she earned the epithet the Lady Tiger. She was also known for her bravery in coping with the royal temper and suggesting harsh things.

The Chao Chom also became the governess of Princess Kunthon – a daughter of Rama I with his Laotian concubine Chao Chom Manda Thongsuk (daughter of Prince Inthavong) after the death of her mother. Rama I died in 1809. His son Prince Isarasundhorn succeeded as Rama II and made his biological mother Lady Nak the Queen Mother. Therefore, the Chao Chom decided to leave the Grand Palace with Princess Kunthon. (Princess Kunthon later became a princess consort to Rama II)

References

Chao Chom
Thai people of Laotian descent
Year of birth missing
Year of death missing
18th-century Chakri dynasty
19th-century Chakri dynasty